Arsène Heitz (27 March 1908 – 1989) was a German-French draughtsman, born in Strasbourg, who worked at the Council of Europe. He is the co-author of the Flag of Europe (in collaboration with Paul M. G. Lévy).

Heitz worked in the postal service of the Council of Europe while the flag was being chosen between 1950 and 1955, and he submitted 21 of the 101 designs that are conserved in the Council of Europe Archives.

He proposed among other drawings a circle of fifteen yellow stars upon a blue background; inspired by the twelve-star halo of the Virgin Mary, the Queen of Heaven of the Book of Revelation, often portrayed in Roman Catholic art, which can be seen in the Rose Window that the Council of Europe donated to Strasbourg Cathedral in 1953. Indeed, he proposed a design with “a crown of 12 golden stars with 5 rays, their points not touching.”

His flag with twelve stars was eventually adopted by the Council, and the design was finalised by Paul M. G. Lévy.

Arsène Heitz, who mainly designed the European flag in 1955, had told Lourdes magazine that his inspiration had been the reference in the Book of Revelation, the New Testament's final section, to "a woman clothed with the sun...and a crown of twelve stars on her head" (Revelation 12:1).

He was a devout Catholic who belonged to the Order of the Miraculous Medal, which may have influenced his views on the symbolism of the 12 stars.

References

History of the European Union
Artists from Strasbourg
French draughtsmen
Council of Europe people
Belgian Roman Catholics
1908 births
1989 deaths
Flag designers